An additive group is a group of which the group operation is to be thought of as addition in some sense.  It is usually abelian, and typically written using the symbol + for its binary operation.

This terminology is widely used with structures equipped with several operations for specifying the structure obtained by forgetting the other operations. Examples include the additive group of the integers, of a vector space and of a ring. This is particularly useful with rings and fields to distinguish the additive underlying group from the multiplicative group of the invertible elements.

References 

Algebraic structures
Group theory